Michael Calvert Appleby OBE is a British ethologist and animal welfare scientist, especially for farm animals. He obtained a BSc in Zoology at the University of Bristol and a PhD in Animal Behaviour at King's College, Cambridge. He then spent 20 years at the Poultry Research Centre in Scotland and the University of Edinburgh researching behaviour, husbandry, and welfare of farm animals. He worked for World Animal Protection (previously WSPA) from 2005–2016, and is now retired.

His early work on stocking densities in poultry and the tethering of pregnant sows contributed to the body of evidence that led, eventually, to major changes in animal welfare and the way these animals are kept. Appleby helped design the Edinburgh Modified Cage, which is a furnished cage for hens, replacing battery cages to improve animal welfare.

He was appointed Officer of the Order of the British Empire (OBE) in the 2017 Birthday Honours for services to animal welfare.

Career 

Previous positions:

 Senior Lecturer in Applied Animal Behavior, University of Edinburgh
 Vice President, head of Farm Animals and Sustainable Agriculture, Humane Society of the United States (2001–2005)
 Chief Scientific Advisor and Welfare Policy Adviser for World Animal Protection

Current positions:

 Visiting Professor in Animal Welfare, Scottish Agricultural College
 Member of the Farm Animal Welfare Council
 Member of the Scientific Committee of Humane Farm Animal Care
 Member of the Animal Compassionate Committee of Whole Foods Market in the US
 Procedural Officer of the International Society for Applied Ethology

Publications 

 Appleby, Michael C. (1991)  Applied animal behaviour: past, present, and future Universities Federation for Animal Welfare. . Retrieved 12 February 2011
 Appleby, Michael C., Barry O. Hughes, H. Arnold Elson (1992) Poultry Production Systems: Behaviour, Management and Welfare CAB International. . Retrieved 3 May 2009
 Appleby, Michael C. (1992). What Should We Do about Animal Welfare? Blackwell Science. . Retrieved 3 May 2009
 Michael Appleby was awarded the Universities Federation of Animal Welfare (UFAW) Hulme Fellowship to write this book
 Appleby, Michael, Alistair B. Lawrence, Barry O. Hughes (1996) Behaviour and Welfare of Extensively Farmed Animals Elsevier Science. Retrieved 3 May 2009
 Appleby, Michael C., Barry O. Hughes (1997). Animal Welfare CAB International. . Retrieved 3 May 2009
 Appleby, Michael C., Joy A. Mench, Barry O. Hughes (2004). Poultry Behaviour and Welfare CAB International. . Retrieved 3 May 2009
 Appleby, Michael C., V. Cussen, L. Lambert, J. Turner (2008) Long Distance Transport and Welfare of Farm Animals CAB International. . Retrieved 3 May 2009
 Appleby, Michael C. (2008). Eating Our Future: The environmental impact of industrial animal agriculture WSPA. Retrieved 20 December 2012

References

External links 
 World Animal Protection
 Universities Federation for Animal Welfare
 Scotland’s Rural College

Living people
British animal welfare scholars
British animal welfare workers
Ethologists
Alumni of the University of Bristol
Alumni of King's College, Cambridge
Officers of the Order of the British Empire
Year of birth missing (living people)